Negerhollands ('Negro-Dutch') was a Dutch-based creole language that was spoken in the Danish West Indies, now known as the U.S. Virgin Islands. Dutch was its superstrate language with Danish, English, French, Spanish, and African elements incorporated. Notwithstanding its name, Negerhollands drew primarily from the Zeelandic rather than the Hollandic dialect of Dutch.

History 

Negerhollands emerged around 1700 on the Virgin Islands Saint Thomas and Saint John, then Danish colonies. According to one of the most prevalent theories about its origin, slaves took the embryonic creole language to the island of Saint Thomas when they accompanied the Dutch planters who fled the island of Sint Eustatius after it had been raided by the English in 1666. A census on Saint Thomas from 1688 indeed shows that of the 317 European households on Saint Thomas, 66 (21%) were Dutch, 32 (10%) were English, and 20 (6%) were Danish. This also helps explain the considerable influence English and Danish had on the development of Negerhollands. On Saint John a similar observation can be made, with a 1721 census establishing that 25 (64%) of the 39 planters there were Dutch, and only nine (23%) were Danes. Another theory is that the language was taken to the Caribbean by slaves from the Dutch slave forts in West Africa and Central Africa (e.g. the Dutch Gold Coast or Dutch Loango-Angola).

From 1732 onwards, Moravian missionaries began visiting the Virgin Islands, who introduced an acrolectal version of the language, called Hoch Kreol. From 1765 till 1834, many texts were produced in this language, which gives Negerhollands an almost unparalleled amount of source texts among creole languages. In 1770, Moravian missionaries printed a primer and a small Lutheran catechism, followed in 1781 by a translation of the New Testament into Hoch Kreol.

The language began to decline in the early-mid 19th century as English became the dominant language of the islands. The service in the Lutheran church was held in Hoch Kreol for the native congregation until the 1830s. As younger generations learned English as a native language, use of Hoch Kreol, whose use became limited to church services, was slowly abandoned, having been replaced by the English-based Virgin Islands Creole. It did, however, survive by the Moravian Orphanage at Nyherrenhut near Tutu well into the twentieth century. As older former orphans were volunteers the old Creole dialect persisted around the orphanage with the encouragement of the elders of the denomination. There was a television special on WBNB in the 1970s which had some former orphans who were by that time quite old.

Alice Stevenson, likely the last native speaker, died in 1987.

Text samples 

Modern Dutch translation: 

English translation: 

Modern Dutch translation:

See also
Berbice Creole Dutch
Skepi Creole Dutch
Jersey Dutch

Notes

References

 
 
 
 
 
 van Sluijs, Robbert. 2013. Negerhollands. In: Michaelis, S., Maurer, P., Haspelmath, M., & Huber, M. (eds.) The Survey of Pidgin and Creole languages. Volume 1: English-based and Dutch-based Languages. Oxford: Oxford University Press.  (via "APiCS Online - Survey chapter: Negerhollands". The Atlas of Pidgin and Creole Language Structures Online. Retrieved July 25, 2022. https://apics-online.info/surveys/27)

External links

 APiCS Online - Survey chapter: Negerhollands
 English translation of Pontoppidan (1881) by Anne Gramberg and Robin Sabino hosted on www.auburn.edu

Dutch-based pidgins and creoles
Danish West Indies
Dutch language in the Americas
Languages of the United States Virgin Islands
Extinct languages of North America
Languages attested from the 17th century
17th-century establishments in North America
Languages extinct in the 1980s
1980s disestablishments in North America
Languages of the African diaspora
Afro-Virgin Islander culture